Charlène Iverna Meyong Menene (born 19 November 1998), known as Charlène Meyong, is a Cameroonian footballer who plays as a midfielder for French club Stade de Reims and the Cameroon women's national team. She represented Cameroon at the 2018 CAF Africa Women's Cup of Nations and 2019 FIFA Women's World Cup.

Meyong began her footballing career at Cameroonian side Louves Minproff. On 4 March 2021 it was announced that she had joined Chinese Women's Super League side Meizhou Hakka on a one-year contract alongside Nigerian footballer Chinwendu Ihezuo ahead of the 2021 league season.

International career 
At the 2018 COSAFA Women's Championship, Meyong was part of the Cameroon side which finished second at the tournament after losing 2-1 in the final to hosts South Africa. Meyong scored one goal at the competition.
She was subsequently selected as part of the Cameroon squad for the 2018 Africa Women's Cup of Nations at which Cameroon finished in third place following semifinal defeat to Nigeria. Meyong made five appearances at the competition.

In 2019 she appeared twice at the FIFA Women's World Cup in matches against Netherlands and Canada.

References

1998 births
Living people
Women's association football midfielders
Cameroonian women's footballers
Cameroon women's international footballers
2019 FIFA Women's World Cup players
African Games silver medalists for Cameroon
African Games medalists in football
Competitors at the 2015 African Games
21st-century Cameroonian women
20th-century Cameroonian women